Spencer Paysinger (born June 28, 1988) is a former American football linebacker. He was signed by the New York Giants as an undrafted free agent in 2011. He played until 2017, and in 2018 became a co-producer and actor on the television series All American, based on the story of his life.

Early life and college
Spencer Paysinger grew up in South Los Angeles, and attended Beverly Hills High School.  He then was made the captain of the football team as a linebacker. He played college football at Oregon. In his last year playing as a senior on the team, Paysinger was the captain and team leader.

His uncle, Carter Paysinger, was the head football coach at BHHS from 1990 to 2009. His father, Donald Paysinger, worked with BHHS as an assistant or head coach for nearly 32 years until 2013.

Professional career

New York Giants 
After not getting selected in the 2011 NFL Draft, Paysinger signed with the New York Giants as an undrafted free agent. As a rookie Paysinger did not get much playing time. In 15 games he racked up 12 tackles. He was a part of the Super Bowl XLVI winning team. In the next three seasons with the New York Giants, he racked up 104 tackles in 47 games. In the 2014 season he was able to get to the quarterback for the first time mustering up his first and only NFL career sack.

Miami Dolphins 
Paysinger signed a one-year contract with the Miami Dolphins on April 2, 2015. He was re-signed by the Dolphins on March 31, 2016. In these two seasons with the Miami Dolphins Paysinger went for a total of 57 tackles.

New York Jets 
On June 9, 2017, Paysinger was signed by the New York Jets. Before he could get any playing time with the team in the regular season, he was released on September 1, 2017.

Carolina Panthers 
On December 5, 2017, Paysinger signed with the Carolina Panthers. He played in three games, before being released by the team on December 29, 2017. He then retired from football.

Television series
Paysingers's life and career served as inspiration for the 2018 The CW series All American where he is a consulting producer and has a minor role as assistant football coach at Beverly Hills High. Paysinger said of the show “It’s immensely important. I know it’s a CW drama, but for the bones of it to center on football, that is something that I take pride in.”

The series All American has gained a massive following in America. It is available for stream on Netflix ; HBO MAX. 

At the beginning of each episode it states that the show was inspired by true events and hence Paysinger's life but the show takes creative control and while the main story is based on Paysinger's life the actual details are tweaked.

References

External links
 
 

1988 births
Living people
Players of American football from Los Angeles
American football linebackers
Oregon Ducks football players
New York Giants players
Miami Dolphins players
New York Jets players
Carolina Panthers players